The IIHF European Women Championships is a former international women's ice hockey tournament between ice hockey playing nations in Europe. Finland's national women's team won the championship title four times and Sweden women's national ice hockey team won it once in 1996, the final year the competition took place.

The European competition was organized by International Ice Hockey Federation (IIHF) and was played from 1989 to 1996. An international women's ice hockey competition sanctioned by the IIHF began in 1990. The European tournament ceased in 1997 because there would be either an IIHF World Women's Championships or an Olympic tournament every year.

History

The late 1980s marks the modern era of organized women's hockey when the first international invitational tournaments were beginning to become organized. The first IIHF European Women’s Championship, was played in Düsseldorf and Ratingen, Germany, in 1989. Team Finland was the first to win the championship.

Winners

See also
Austria women's ice hockey Bundesliga
German women's ice hockey Bundesliga
Switzerland women's ice hockey league

External links
Hockey Archives - Championnats d'Europe féminins 1989 
Hockey Archives - Championnats d'Europe féminins 1991 
Hockey Archives - Championnats d'Europe féminins 1993 
Hockey Archives - Championnats d'Europe féminins 1995 
Hockey Archives - Championnats d'Europe féminins 1996

References

 
Ice hockey tournaments in Europe
International Ice Hockey Federation tournaments
Women's ice hockey tournaments
Women's sports competitions in Europe
European championships
Defunct ice hockey competitions in Europe
Recurring sporting events established in 1989
1989 establishments in Europe
Recurring sporting events disestablished in 1996
1996 disestablishments in Europe